The 9th Islamic Consultative Assembly was 33rd Parliament of Iran that commenced on 27 May 2012 following the legislative elections on 2 March and 4 May 2012 and was closed on 24 May 2016.

Composition 
The parliament was dominated by the conservatives. There were two main parliamentary groups active during the term: The majority Followers of Wilayat (Rahrovan) led by Ali Larijani and chaired by Kazem Jalali, along with the minority Principlists fraction led by Gholam-Ali Haddad-Adel. The latter was composed of more conservative groupings such as Paydari and Pathseekers, however Larijani's fraction was hostile towards President Mahmoud Ahmadinejad.

In the first session Speaker election, Haddad-Adel lost to Larijani with 100 to 173 votes out of total 275.

See also 
 Majlis special commission for examining the JCPOA
 Iran Nuclear Achievements Protection Act
 Iranian Government's Reciprocal and Proportional Action in Implementing the JCPOA Act

References

 
Presidency of Hassan Rouhani